Ilya Vladimirovich Byakin (born February 2, 1963, in Sverdlovsk, Soviet Union) is a retired ice hockey player who played in the Soviet Hockey League and National Hockey League.  He played for HC Spartak Moscow, Avangard Omsk, Edmonton Oilers, and San Jose Sharks.  He was inducted into the Russian and Soviet Hockey Hall of Fame in 1988.

Career statistics

Regular season and playoffs

International

External links
 
 Russian and Soviet Hockey Hall of Fame bio

1963 births
Avangard Omsk players
Avtomobilist Yekaterinburg players
Cape Breton Oilers players
Edmonton Oilers draft picks
Edmonton Oilers players
EV Landshut players
HC CSKA Moscow players
HC Lada Togliatti players
HC Spartak Moscow players
Ice hockey players at the 1988 Winter Olympics
Kansas City Blades players
Las Vegas Thunder players
Living people
Malmö Redhawks players
Olympic gold medalists for the Soviet Union
Olympic ice hockey players of the Soviet Union
Sportspeople from Yekaterinburg
SC Rapperswil-Jona Lakers players
Russian ice hockey coaches
Russian ice hockey defencemen
San Antonio Dragons players
San Jose Sharks players
Soviet ice hockey defencemen
Olympic medalists in ice hockey
Honoured Masters of Sport of the USSR